Sammie Haynes (May 29, 1920 – November 11, 1997) was an American Negro league catcher in the 1930s and 1940s.

A native of Atlanta, Georgia, Haynes made his Negro leagues debut in 1939 with the Atlanta Black Crackers. From 1943 to 1945, he played for the Kansas City Monarchs, where he was a teammate of Baseball Hall of Famer Jackie Robinson in the 1945 season. After his time in Kansas City, Haynes went on to manage the newly reorganized Atlanta Black Crackers.

Haynes lost his sight later in life, and subsequently founded a charity to help needy ex-athletes. He died in Los Angeles, California in 1997 at age 77.

References

External links
 and Seamheads
 Sammie Haynes at Negro League Baseball Players Association

1920 births
1997 deaths
Atlanta Black Crackers players
Kansas City Monarchs players
Baseball catchers
Baseball players from Atlanta
20th-century African-American sportspeople